Albrecht Rosengarten (1809–1893), was among the first Jewish Germans to be permitted to train and practice as an architect.

While still a student, he assisted Heinrich Hübsch with the design of the Kassel Synagogue of 1839.

books

 Handbook of Architectural Styles,  translated from the German in 1894

References

1809 births
1893 deaths
19th-century German Jews
19th-century German architects